Craytonia (also Cretonia) is an unincorporated community in Fannin County, Georgia, United States.

History
Prior to European colonization, the area that is now Craytonia was inhabited by the Cherokee people and other Indigenous peoples for thousands of years.

Notes

Unincorporated communities in Fannin County, Georgia
Unincorporated communities in Georgia (U.S. state)